Angerton may refer to several places:

Angerton, South Lakeland, Cumbria, England
Angerton, Allerdale, Cumbria, England
Angerton railway station, Low Angerton, Northumberland, England
, hamlet and former civil parish in Northumberland, England
, hamlet and former civil parish in Northumberland, England